The 22nd South East Asian Junior and Cadet Table Tennis Championships 2016 were held in Phnom Penh, Cambodia.

Medal summary

Events

Medal table

See also

2016 World Junior Table Tennis Championships
2016 Asian Junior and Cadet Table Tennis Championships
Asian Table Tennis Union

References

South East Asian Table Tennis Championships
South East Asian Junior and Cadet Table Tennis Championships
South East Asian Junior and Cadet Table Tennis Championships
South East Asian Junior and Cadet Table Tennis Championships
Table tennis competitions in Cambodia
International sports competitions hosted by Cambodia
South East Asian Junior and Cadet Table Tennis Championships